Bisade Ologunde (in Lagos, 1960) is a Nigerian afrobeat musician, singer-songwriter and percussionist. Widely known as Lágbájá for his signature use of mask which covers his identity. He believes in social reform through music.

Early life and career
Ologunde adopted the name Lágbájá (meaning "Jane Doe" or "John Doe"- A person whose name, identity is intentionally concealed in Yoruba) as he embarked on his career in the early 90s. His name was reflected in his choice of stage attire – a slitted textile and rubber mask adopted so that the artist represented the ‘common man’ in keeping with the carnival tradition of Yoruba Culture. He formed his first small band in 1991 in Lagos after he had taught himself to play the saxophone. With a high quotient of percussion instruments including congas and talking drums, Lagbaja's album We Before Me (IndigeDisc/PDSE), released in 2000, demanded honesty from politicians and urged brotherhood and unity. He shared lyrics of his songs with a backup singer, Ego Ihenacho, and equally plays tenor saxophone. With a firm, brawny tone akin to that of John Coltrane and Pharoah Sanders, he emblazoned the melodies of the songs, sometimes with Ego scat-singing along.

Awards 
2006 Channel O Music Video Awards – Best Male Video ("Never Far Away")

Discography 
 'Ikira', 1993
 Lagbaja, 1993
 Cest Un African Thing, 1996
 ME, 2000
 WE, 2000
 We and Me Part II, 2000
 ABAMI, 2000
 Africano... the mother of groove, 2005
 Paradise, 2009
 Sharp Sharp, 2009
 200 Million Mumu (The Bitter Truth), 2012

See also
List of Yoruba people

References

External links
Lagbaja's official home page

Nigerian saxophonists
Year of birth missing (living people)
Nigerian songwriters
Yoruba musicians
Living people
Musicians from Lagos
20th-century Nigerian musicians
21st-century Nigerian musicians
English-language singers from Nigeria
Yoruba-language singers
20th-century saxophonists
21st-century saxophonists
20th-century Nigerian male singers
21st-century Nigerian male singers